Wilhelmina H Skog (born 1938) is a South African former cricketer who played as a bowler. She appeared in three Test matches for South Africa in 1972, all against New Zealand, taking three wickets. She played domestic cricket for Western Province and Southern Transvaal.

References

External links
 
 

Living people
1938 births
Cricketers from Cape Town
South African women cricketers
South Africa women Test cricketers
Western Province women cricketers
Central Gauteng women cricketers